Internal thoracic vessels may refer to:
 Internal thoracic artery
 Internal thoracic vein